The 1883 New York Gothams season was the franchise's first season. The team replaced the Troy Trojans when the National League awarded its franchise rights to John B. Day. The team went 46–50, finishing in sixth place.

Regular season

Season standings

Record vs. opponents

Roster

Player stats

Batting

Starters by position
Note: Pos = Position; G = Games played; AB = At bats; H = Hits; Avg. = Batting average; HR = Home runs; RBI = Runs batted in

Other batters
Note: G = Games played; AB = At bats; H = Hits; Avg. = Batting average; HR = Home runs; RBI = Runs batted in

Pitching

Starting pitchers
Note: G = Games pitched; IP = Innings pitched; W = Wins; L = Losses; ERA = Earned run average; SO = Strikeouts

References
1883 New York Gothams season at Baseball Reference

San Francisco Giants seasons
New York Gothams season
New York Goth
19th century in Manhattan
Washington Heights, Manhattan